Lao Ti also called Lao Di are an ethnic group of Ratchaburi Province in western Thailand near the Burma border. The group was first studied in 1939 by the Danish ethnologist Erik Seidenfaden.

References

Ethnic groups in Thailand
Tai peoples